The Men's Central American Volleyball Championship is the official competition for senior men’s national volleyball teams of Central America and the Caribbean, organized by the Central American Volleyball Confederation (AFECAVOL). Since its introduction in 1974, the tournament has been held every two years. The competition has been dominated by two teams: Panama, with 8 titles, and Costa Rica, with 6 titles. Following these are Guatemala, with 4 titles, and Honduras, who have won twice.

History

Medals Summary

See also

 NORCECA Men's Volleyball Championship
 Men's Junior NORCECA Volleyball Championship
 Girls' Youth NORCECA Volleyball Championship
 Volleyball at the Pan American Games
 Men's Pan-American Volleyball Cup
 Volleyball at the Central American and Caribbean Games

References

External links
 AFECAVOL
 Todor 66 Central America Championship

Recurring sporting events established in 1974
Volleyball in Central America
Volleyball in the Caribbean
International volleyball competitions
International men's volleyball competitions
Biennial sporting events